The 1934 Wightman Cup was the 12th edition of the annual women's team tennis competition between the United States and Great Britain. It was held at the All England Lawn Tennis and Croquet Club in London in England in the United Kingdom.

See also
 1934 Davis Cup

References

Wightman Cups by year
Wightman Cup, 1934
Wightman Cup
Wightman Cup
Wightman Cup
Wightman Cup